Andrew James "A. J." Trauth (born September 14, 1986) is an American actor and musician. Trauth is known for playing Alan Twitty on Even Stevens and Josh Mankey on Kim Possible, both programs which aired on Disney Channel.

Acting career

Trauth is known for playing Alan Twitty on Even Stevens and did a guest role in The Amanda Show opposite Amanda Bynes and Drake Bell. Later he worked with Bell and Brenda Song in an episode of R. L. Stine's show taken from the book series: The Nightmare Room in the episode "Dear Diary I'm Dead".

On the TV show Kim Possible, Trauth voiced Josh Mankey, a one-time love interest of Kim (voiced by Christy Carlson Romano).

Trauth also made a guest appearance on Reba as Kyra's 17-year-old date Scott in the episode the "United Front". Trauth starred in the Disney Channel original movie You Wish! alongside Lalaine Vergara. He has also worked opposite Rebecca Romijn in Pepper Dennis as the title character's younger brother, Mitch. Trauth also appeared in an episode of House, playing an older brother in the clinic when his little brother gets treated by Dr. House.

In 2003, Trauth guest starred on 7th Heaven, in the eighth season episode "Getting to Know You". In 2006, Trauth guest starred on the CBS drama Numb3rs, and on the Fox drama Bones in 2009.

Personal life
On February 5, 2014, Us Weekly announced that Trauth became engaged to actress Leah Pipes, after almost three years of dating. They married on December 6, 2014 in Santa Barbara, California. Pipes filed for divorce in May 2019 citing "irreconcilable differences."

Filmography

References

External links
Official A. J. Trauth website
Official Mavin website

1986 births
Male actors from Chicago
American male child actors
American male film actors
American rock guitarists
American male guitarists
American male television actors
Living people
Singers from Chicago
20th-century American male actors
21st-century American male actors
Guitarists from Chicago
21st-century American singers
21st-century American guitarists
21st-century American male singers